This is a list of Vahompa (Kings) of the Gciriku, one of the Kavango peoples of the north of Namibia, and in which village their Mbara (royal homestead) was located.

Shimwemwe, lived at Ndonga-linena and Mpupa and was the king of the Gciriku tribe from 1785 to 1805.
Kayengoma, ruled from 1805-1812 and his Mbara was at Ndonga-linena.
Mulyata, ruled from 1812-1830 and he lived at Mayara.
Nandundu, ruled from 1830-1832 and she also lived at Mayara.
Muduva lived at Rutco, was a ruler from 1832-1860.
Shirongo, king of the Gciriku tribe from 1860-1864.
Muhera lived at Ngurungu, king of the Gciriku from 1865-1874.
Nyangana ruled from 1874-1924. He lived at Shitopogho, Matumba, Kanyondo and Mamono.
Haingura, 1925 to 1944 was a ruler and he lived at Mamono.
Linus Mudumbi Shashipapo ruled from 1945 to 1984. He lived at Ndiyona.
Sebastian Kamwanga, 1985 to 1999, had his royal seat at Mamono.
Kassian Shiyambi, Gciriku King.died November 2019

References 

History of Namibia
Kavango Region